José Antonio Guillermo Divito, also known simply as Divito (July 16, 1914 in Buenos Aires – July 5, 1969 in Lages) was an Argentine illustrator, cartoonist, caricaturist and editor who, through his comic illustrations and humor had great influence in the decades from 1940 to 1960. He was the founder and director of Rico Tipo.

References

External links
 Divito por Geno Díaz
 Chicas de Divito, Pedro Seguí y Torino
 Tapa de Rico Tipo, años '60
 Comentario sobre Divito y Rico Tipo, acompañado de ilustraciones
 El otro yo del Dr. Merengue
 Nota periodística en el diario La Capital, de Rosario, a raíz de una exposición de dibujos de Divito
 Homenaje a Divito en el blog Lápiz y Papel, por los cuarenta años de su fallecimiento.

1914 births
1968 deaths
Argentine comics artists
Argentine comics writers
Argentine publishers (people)
Argentine caricaturists
Argentine illustrators